HMS Rob Roy was a Royal Navy R-class destroyer constructed and then operational in the First World War. The ship served in the Grand Fleet as part of the Fifteenth Destroyer Flotilla.

Construction
Rob Roy was one of two Admiralty R-class destroyers ordered from the Scottish shipbuilder William Denny and Brothers by the British Admiralty in July 1915 as part of the 
Sixth War Construction Programme.  The ship was laid down at Denny's Dumbarton shipyard as yard number 1056 on 15 October 1915 and was launched on 29 August 1916. She was completed on 15 December 1916.

Armament consisted of three QF 4in Mk IV guns on the ship's centreline, with one on the forecastle, one aft on a raised bandstand and one between the second and third funnels. There was a single 2-pounder (40 mm) pom-pom anti-aircraft gun, while torpedo armament consisted of four 21 inch (533 mm) torpedoes in two twin mounts. The ship had a complement of 82 officers and men.

Service
On commissioning, Rob Roy joined the Fifteenth Destroyer Flotilla of the Grand Fleet. On 18 January 1917 Rob Roy was one of six destroyers that were sent with the destroyer leader  to temporarily reinforce the Harwich Force. On the night of 23/24 January 1917, the Harwich Force was ordered to intercept a German destroyer flotilla that was being transferred from Germany to Zeebrugge. Commodore Reginald Tyrwhitt, commander of the Harwich Force, split his forces into several groups to increase his chances of intercepting the German force. Rob Roy was part of a group of destroyers patrolling off the River Maas, with two more groups of destroyers off the Schouwen Bank while two groups of cruisers waited between the Hinder and the Maas. The German force ran into one of the cruiser divisions, with the destroyers  and  heavily damaged, but the Germans managed to break contact. Several of the British destroyers, including Rob Roys group, left their patrol positions on hearing the noise of the engagement with the hope of joining in, allowing the German ships to slip through. One German straggler, encountered a British destroyer patrol and sank the destroyer  before escaping.

On 14 February Rob Roy, which had returned to the Grand Fleet, was ordered to patrol between Peterhead and Aberdeen as a result of attacks on shipping by the German submarine , but UC-44 returned to base unhindered. From 15 June 1917 the destroyers and submarines of the Grand Fleet took part in Operation BB,  a large scale operation against German submarines, with 53 destroyers and leaders together with 17 submarines deployed on offensive patrols on the transit route for the Germans from the North Sea and around the Orkney and Shetland Islands to the Western Approaches. The Fifteenth Destroyer Flotilla, including Rob Roy, was assigned to patrol in an area to the east of Shetland and Fair Isle. Overall, 61 sightings were made of German submarines until the operation ended on 24 June, of which 12 resulted in attacks on the submarines, but no submarines were sunk or damaged.

She was employed on convoy escort duties, and on 6 August was part of the escort for the homeward-bound Convoy HH.11 when the merchant ship  was torpedoed and sunk by the German submarine . East-bound convoys were led across the Atlantic by an ocean escort, a cruiser or armed merchantman, rendezvousing with an escort of destroyers and sloops for passage through the dangerous Western approaches. On 11 August Rob Roy left Buncrana as part of a force of eight sloops and destroyers, meeting up with Convoy HH.13 on 14 August and escorting the convoy without loss until it dispersed. She returned to the Fifteenth Flotilla from her detachment in October 1917.

Rob Roy remained part of the Fifteenth Destroyer Flotilla at the end of the First World War on 11 November 1918.

She was sold for scrap on 13 July 1926.

See also
Rob Roy

Notes

Citations

Bibliography

 

Ships built on the River Clyde
World War I destroyers of the United Kingdom
R-class destroyers (1916)
1916 ships